The Swimming competition at the 11th FINA World Aquatics Championships consisted of 40 long course events, swum July 24–31, 2005 at pools in Parc Jean-Drapeau in Montreal, Quebec, Canada. Swimming's 40 events were split evenly between males and females (20 each) and were:
freestyle (free): 50, 100, 200, 400, 800 and 1500;
backstroke (back): 50, 100 and 200;
breaststroke (breast): 50, 100 and 200;
butterfly (fly): 50, 100 and 200;
Individual Medley (IM): 200 and 400; and
relay: 4×100 and 4×200 freestyle, and 4×100 medley.

Event schedule

Results

Men

Legend:

Women

Medal standings

Records

World records
Nine World Records were set at the 2005 World Championships.

Championships records
Fifteen Championships (or meet) records were set at the 2005 World Championships.
Note: Results followed by an asterisk (*) denote that the record was subsequently re-broken during the competition.

See also
List of World Championships records in swimming
Swimming at the 2003 World Aquatics Championships (previous Worlds)
Swimming at the 2004 Summer Olympics (previous year)
Swimming at the 2007 World Aquatics Championships (subsequent Worlds)

References

External links
 Full swimming results posted on OmegaTiming.com
 PDF of all swimming results

 
2005 World Aquatics Championships
World Aquatics Championships
Swimming at the World Aquatics Championships